Vladimir Fyodorovich Gribunin (in Kostroma Governorate, Russian Empire – 1 April 1933 in Moscow, USSR), was a male actor from the Russian Empire and later the Soviet Union.

He learned drama at the Maly Theatre Drama college in the class of Mikhail Sadovsky, then joined the Moscow Art Theatre in 1898 with which he stayed until his death in 1933. Critically lauded were his performances as Nikita (in Leo Tolstoy's Power of Darkness), Simeonov-Pishchik (Anton Chekhov's The Cherry Orchard) and Kuroslepov in the 1926 production of Alexander Ostrovsky's An Ardent Heart, the latter considered to be the high point of his artistic career. He was cast in three early Soviet films: Alyosha's Pipe (Алёшина дудка, 1919), Threesome (Трое, 1919) and Limping Landlord (Хромой барин, 1920).

"Never rivaling Stanislavski, Moskvin, Kachalov or Leonidov in terms of the scope of artistic gift or influence in the theatre, he accepted his destiny with dignity and enjoyed an artistic life that was happy in its own way, at least undistorted," the biographer I. Solovyova argued. A highly original, carefree character, he was still, in a way, indispensable. At the outset of the Russo-Japanese War, as the danger of losing actors to the army became real, Vladimir Nemirovich-Danchenko wrote in a June 1904 letter to Stanislavski: "Only Gribunin would be greatly missed, none of the others would take away from our theatre's aroma and charisma."

In 1925 he was awarded the title the Meritorious Artist of the RSFSR. The actress Vera Pashennaya was his wife.

References 

1873 births
1933 deaths
People from Ivanovo Oblast
People from Yuryevetsky Uyezd
Male actors from the Russian Empire
Soviet male actors